is a Japanese shōjo manga artist. Her major works include Me & My Brothers, which ran in Hakusensha's LaLa magazine from 2004 to 2009 and was released in 11 volumes; and Gakuen Babysitters, which is ongoing in LaLa and has been released in 14 volumes.

Works

References

External links
 
 Hakusensha's interview with Hari Tokeino for Me & My Brothers

Living people
1979 births
Women manga artists
Manga artists from Chiba Prefecture
Japanese female comics artists
Female comics writers
Japanese women writers